The United Arab Emirates women's national football team represents United Arab Emirates in international women's football, and is run by the United Arab Emirates Football Association (UAEFA). Its highest ranking in the FIFA Women's World Rankings is 73rd, achieved in March 2015 at its first appearance in the ranking.
UAE defeated Jordan in the 2010 WAFF Women's Championship, thus claiming their first WAFF Women's Championship title. UAE back in the 2011 WAFF Women's Championship defended their title against Iran in the final.

History

Debut
Even though the UAE is the most modern Arab country in the Middle East, known for its tourism, commercial and financial centers, and home to the tallest building in the world, Burj Khalifa, the women's and girls soccer scene remains small. It took the UAE hosting the FIFA Club World Cup in Abu Dhabi in 2009, when Barcelona won its first title in club history, for women's soccer to enter the national conversation in earnest.

During the tournament, it was hard to be in the UAE and miss a game; televisions everywhere aired the matches, people talked about goals and results in the streets, and large groups gathered to watch the best women's club teams in the world go head-to-head. Shortly after that, the UAE formed a women's national team, and in 2010 the team competed in its first international competition, 2010 WAFF Women's Championship hosted in the UAE. the tournament saw the high-performance Emirati women's team played with, starting with their opening match against Palestine in which they won four goals to two. their second match against fellow debutant team Kuwait marked their biggest victory to date, the match ended 7–0. topping the group they qualified for its first semi-finals in which they faced a competitive Bahrain, with four goals they confirmed their place in the final against the Jordanian team. two times champion Jordan faced the debuting host Emirati team in the final. the match ended one to nil in favor of the UAE. marking history for the team and the country. UAE was the second country to lift the trophy.

Consecutive Win
In 2011 the UAE team back for their second international tournament, 2011 WAFF Women's Championship being the defending champion, the UAE entered the tournament with big hopes to clinch it again. the UAE opened their campaign against Syria defeating them 6 to nil. their second match, however, saw their first loss, losing to Iran 1–4, the team came in matchday 3 to prove their abilities to defend their title as they defeated Lebanon five to nil. making it past the group stage they faced Bahrain in the semifinals winning the match they made it to the Final against Iran, In a tense conclusion to an exciting final, the UAE defeated Iran 6–5 in a penalty shootout last night to win the West Asian Football Federation Women's Championship last night before a vociferous crowd at Sultan bin Zayed Stadium.

Results and fixtures

The following is a list of match results in the last 12 months, as well as any future matches that have been scheduled.

Legend

2022
 
}}

Coaching staff

Current coaching staff

Manager history

, after the match against .

Players

Current squad
The following players were named to the squad for the friendlies against Syria on 17, 19, and 21 August 2022.

Caps and goals are correct as of 23 October 2022 after match against .

(Players are listed within position group by order of kit number, caps, goals, seniority, and then alphabetically)

Recent call-ups
The following players have been named to the squad in the past 12 months.

(Players are listed within position group by order of latest call-up, caps, goals, seniority, and then alphabetically)

Honours

Regional
WAFF Women's Championship
  Champions: 2010, 2011

Other tournaments

Record per opponent
Key

The following table shows United Arab Emirates's all-time official international record per opponent:

Competitive record

FIFA Women's World Cup

*Draws include knockout matches decided on penalty kicks.

AFC Women's Asian Cup

*Draws include knockout matches decided on penalty kicks.

Asian Games

*Draws include knockout matches decided on penalty kicks.

WAFF Women's Championship

See also
Women's football in United Arab Emirates
United Arab Emirates women's national under-20 football team
United Arab Emirates women's national under-17 football team

References

External links
 

َArabic women's national association football teams
 
Asian women's national association football teams